Dylan Moss is a Welsh rugby union player who plays for Ospreys as a winger.

Moss made his debut for the Ospreys in 2018 against Zebre having previously played for the Ospreys academy and Bridgend Ravens.

References

External links 
Ospreys Player Profile

1998 births
Living people
English people of Welsh descent
English rugby union players
Ospreys (rugby union) players
Rugby union players from Milton Keynes
Rugby union wings